Docking Lynn Rural District was a rural district in Norfolk, England from 1894 to 1974.

It was formed under the Local Government Act 1894 based on the Docking rural sanitary district.  It covered an area south and east of Hunstanton.

The only changes to its boundaries during its 80 years of existence were caused by a series of expansions of Hunstanton Urban District (1902, 1925 & 1928). In 1974, the district was abolished under the Local Government Act 1972, and became part of the West Norfolk district.

Parishes

References

Districts of England created by the Local Government Act 1894
Districts of England abolished by the Local Government Act 1972
Historical districts of Norfolk
Rural districts of England